The lymphatic pump is a method of manipulation used by physicians who practice manual medicine (primarily osteopathic physicians).

History
The term lymphatic pump was invented by Earl Miller, D.O. to describe what was formerly known in osteopathic medicine as the thoracic pump technique.

Technique
The technique is applied to a person lying down by holding their ankle and applying gentle pressure repeatedly using the leg as a "lever" to rock the pelvis.

Relative contraindications
While no firmly established absolute contraindications exist for lymphatic techniques, the following cases are examples of relative contraindications: bone fractures, bacterial infections with fever, abscesses, and cancer.

References

Alternative medicine
Osteopathic manipulative medicine
Osteopathic techniques
Manual medicine